The New Standard D-25 was a 5-seat agricultural and joy-riding aircraft produced in the US from 1928.

Construction
The D-25 was constructed from Duralumin angles channels and tees bolted and riveted together for the fuselage and Spruce spars with bass wood and plywood built-up ribs, all fabric covered. The D series was quite distinctive in having  sesquiplane wings with the upper wing, of much bigger span and chord, supported on tall cabane and interplane struts.

Operational use
Seating for four passengers was provided in the open front cockpit, described as "chummy", with the pilot in the single seat open rear cockpit. Variations in seating arrangement reflected the role of the different variants. The rugged structure gave the New Standard Ds a long-life, leading to the respectable number that survived the abuse of joy-riding, mail carrying and crop dusting for many years.

Two D-25As that had been confiscated from smugglers were acquired by the US Coast Guard in 1935, designated NT-2.

Variants

 Gates-Day GD-24 - precursor to New Standard D series 3 built.
 New Standard D-24 - production version of GD-24 4 built + 2 converted from GD-24.
 New Standard D-25 - 5-seat "joy-rider"
 New Standard D-25A - 225 hp Wright J-6
 New Standard D-25B - 300 hp Wright J-6 crop-duster produced by White Aircraft Co. 1940
 New Standard D-25C - alternative designation of D-29S
 New Standard D-25X - modified D-25 construction number 203.
 New Standard NT-2 - 2 x D-25 impounded from whiskey smugglers, donated to US Coast Guard.
 New Standard D-26 - 3-seat business/executive transport.
 New Standard D-26A & D-26B - D-26 with 225 hp Wright J-6.
 New Standard D-27 - single seat mail/cargo carrier
 New Standard D-27A - D-27 with night flying equipment
 New Standard D-28 - floatplane conversion of D-26
 New Standard D-30 - floatplane modified D-25
 New Standard D-25 - New production of modified D-25As

Operators

Alaskan Airways (D-25)
Clifford Ball Inc. (D-27)
Goodfolk & O'Tymes Biplane Rides (D-25)
 Cole Palen's Old Rhinebeck Aerodrome (2 D-25s, N176H active, N19157 undergoing restoration  
United States Coast Guard

Specifications (D-25)

See also

References
Notes

Bibliography

External links
 Old Rhinebeck Aerodrome's N176H New Standard D-25 page (current ride aircraft in 2021)
 Old Rhinebeck Aerodrome's N19157 New Standard D-25 page (aircraft under restoration in 2021)

1920s United States sport aircraft
Sesquiplanes
Single-engined tractor aircraft
Aircraft first flown in 1929